Freeman Walker (October 25, 1780September 23, 1827) was a United States senator from Georgia. Born in Charles City, Virginia, he attended the common schools; in 1797, he moved to Augusta, Georgia.

Walker studied law, and was admitted to the bar in 1803, commencing practice in Augusta. He was a member of the Georgia House of Representatives from 1807 to 1811, and was mayor of Augusta in 1818 and 1819. He was elected as a Democratic-Republican to the U.S. Senate to fill the vacancy caused by the resignation of John Forsyth, serving from November 6, 1819, to August 6, 1821, when he resigned. He was again mayor of Augusta in 1823. Walker died in Augusta in 1827; interment was in the Walker family cemetery.

Freeman Walker's son was Confederate major general William H.T. Walker, who served in the American Civil War.

Popular culture
"Freeman Walker" is a 2008 novel by David Allan Cates, and is also the name of the title character. There is no connection between this fictional character and the historical Walker, though the story is set in the South in the 19th century, and the use of the same name may have been a coincidence.

Legacy
Walker County, Georgia, was named for Senator Walker.

References

External links

1780 births
1827 deaths
People from Charles City County, Virginia
Georgia (U.S. state) lawyers
Members of the Georgia House of Representatives
Mayors of Augusta, Georgia
United States senators from Georgia (U.S. state)
Walker County, Georgia
Democratic-Republican Party United States senators
Georgia (U.S. state) Democratic-Republicans
19th-century American politicians
American slave owners
American lawyers admitted to the practice of law by reading law
19th-century American lawyers

United States senators who owned slaves